The Opel Kadett is a small family car produced by the German automobile manufacturer Opel from 1936 until 1940 and then from 1962 until 1991 (the Cabrio continued until 1993), when it was succeeded by the Opel Astra.

Kadett I (1936–1940)

The first Opel car to carry the Kadett name was presented to the public in December 1936 by Opel's Commercial-Technical director, Heinrich Nordhoff, who would in later decades become known for his leadership role in building up the Volkswagen company.

The new Kadett followed the innovative Opel Olympia in adopting a chassis-less unibody construction, suggesting that like the Vauxhall 10 introduced in 1937 by Opel's English sister-company, the Opel Kadett was designed for high volume low-cost production.

Kadett serie 11234 (1937)
The body resembled that of the existing larger Opel Olympia and its silhouette reflected the "streamlining" tendencies of the time. The "11234" nomenclature stands for the engine's displacement in deciliters (11) followed by the wheelbase in centimeters (234).

The brakes were now controlled using a hydraulic mechanism. The suspension featured synchronous springing, a suspension configuration already seen on the manufacturer's larger models and based on the Dubonnet system for which General Motors in France had purchased the license. The General Motors version, which had been further developed by Opel's North American parent, was intended to provide a soft ride, but there was some criticism that handling and road-holding were compromised, especially when the system was applied to small light-weight cars such as the Kadett. By the end of 1937 33,402 of these first-generation Kadetts had been produced.

Kadett "KJ38" and "K38 Spezial" (1938–1940)
From December 1937 a modified front grill identified an upgrade. The 1,074cc Opel  engine and the  wheelbase were unchanged, with few differences between the cars for 1937 and those for 1938.

The manufacturer now offered two versions of the Kadett, designated the "Kadett KJ38 and the "Kadett K38" the latter also being sold as the "Kadett Spezial". Mechanically and in terms of published performance there was little to differentiate the two, but the "Spezial" had a chrome stripe below the window line and extra external body trim in other areas such as on the front grill. The interior of the "Spezial" was also better equipped. To the extent that the 300 Mark saving for buyers of the car reflected reduced production costs, the major difference was that the more basic "KJ38" lost the synchromous springing with which the car had been launched, and which continued to be fitted on the "Spezial". The base car instead reverted to traditional rigid axle based suspension similar to that fitted on the old Opel P4.

The base car was available only as a two-door "Limousine" (sedan/saloon). Customers looking for a soft-top "Cabrio-limousine" would need to specify a "Kadett Spezial".

The "Kadett K38 Spezial" fared better in the market place: in 1938 and again in 1939 it was Germany's top-selling small car. By May 1941 the company had produced 17,871 "Kadett KJ38"s and 56,335 "Kadett K38 Spezial"s.

Commercial
Competitive pricing led to commercial success, and Kadetts continued to be produced during the early months of the war: by the time production ended in May 1940, following the intensification of World War II, 106,608 of these Opel Kadetts were produced on the assembly line at Opel's Rüsselsheim plant, which had been the first major car plant in Germany to apply the assembly-line techniques pioneered by Henry Ford.

Soviet afterlife

After the Second World War the Soviet Union requested the tooling from the Opel Rüsselsheim car plant in the American occupation zone as part of the war reparations agreed by the victorious powers, to compensate for the loss of the production lines for the domestic KIM-10-52 in the siege of Moscow. Faced with a wide range of German "small litrage" models to choose from, Soviet planners wanted a car that closely followed the general type of the KIM – a 4-door sedan with an all-metal body and 4-stroke engine. They, therefore, rejected both the rear-engined, two-door KdF-Wagen (future VW Beetle) and the two-stroke powered, front-wheel-drive, wooden-bodied DKW F8, built by the Auto Union Chemnitz plant in the Soviet occupation zone. The closest analog of the KIM to be found was the 4-door Kadett K38.

On 26 August 1945, the State Defense Committee published Order No. 9905, which prescribed the start of production of the 4-door Kadett on the Moscow small car plant "without any changes to the design". The implementation of the plan was far from smooth. The Rüsselsheim plant had been deeply involved in the Nazi war effort, producing aircraft engines for the Luftwaffe, and consequently has been heavily damaged by the Allied air raids. Very little was left to be salvaged – mostly incoherent drawings and plans, with several stamping dies for the 2-door version of the Kadett to add.

Still, a number of Kadetts had been captured as trophies by the Red Army and were available for study and reverse-engineering. This project was conducted by design bureaus formed as Soviet-German joint ventures under the Soviet Military Administration in Germany (SMAD). There were 11 of them in total. One in Berlin reverse-engineered the engine and transmission. Another in Schwarzenberg worked on the steel body. The wooden-bodied station wagon was developed in Chemnitz. The vast majority of the personnel of these design bureaus were German specialists and craftsmen hired by the Military Administration. These design bureaus not only prepared the necessary blueprints and documentation, but also provided the wooden master model for the body. They even developed the new trim pieces which distinguished the Moskvitch from its Opel prototype, including hood emblems and hubcaps with a large "M" (for "Moskvitch"). However, the stamping dies and most of the tooling had to be produced in the USSR.

Production started on 4 December 1946. The Moskvitch 400/420 continued to be made in Moscow with some minor changes until 1956, when it was replaced by the Moskvitch 402. The latter was an all-new design apart from the engine, for which Moskvitch continued to use the Kadett side-valve engine until 1958, when it was replaced with a domestically designed OHV engine.

Kadett A (1962–1965)

The Kadett was reintroduced in 1962, with deliveries beginning on 2 October, a little more than 22 years after the original model was discontinued in May 1940. The new car (designated the Kadett A) was a small family car like its predecessor, although it was now available in 2-door saloon, 3-door estate ("Car-A-Van") and coupé versions.

Kadett B (1965–1973)

The Kadett B was launched at the Frankfurt Motor Show in late summer 1965, The Kadett B was larger all-round than the Kadett A: 5% longer both overall and in terms of the wheelbase, 7% wider and 9% heavier (unladen weight), albeit  lower in basic standard "Limousine" (sedan/saloon) form. Production ended in July 1973, with the successor model introduced a month later following the summer shut-down, in August. The two-seat Opel GT was heavily based on Kadett B components, its body made by a French contractor, Brissonneau & Lotz, at their Creil factory.

Kadett C (1973–1979)

The Kadett C appeared in August 1973 and was Opel's version of the General Motors' "T-Car". It was the last small Opel to feature rear-wheel drive, and remained in production at Opel's Bochum plant until July 1979, by which time Opel had produced 1,701,076. Of these, 52% had been exported outside West Germany, most of them to markets in other parts of western Europe.

The Kadett C was mirrored in Europe by its British derivative - the Vauxhall Chevette.  For the first time the Opel Kadett and its Vauxhall equivalent were now very clearly the same car, and marked the gradual convergence of Opel and Vauxhall models, which would be completed with the later Kadett D.

Kadett D (1979–1984)

The Kadett D was introduced in the middle of August 1979, with deliveries on the home market beginning early in September 1979. In November 1979, the car went on sale in the United Kingdom, some five months before the Vauxhall Astra Mark 1, the British version, was launched in April 1980. The cars were designed as three- or five-door hatchbacks and estates or station wagons. There were also two- and four-door sedans featuring separate boots/trunks, which shared the silhouettes of the hatchbacks: in the United Kingdom, the sedan versions were soon withdrawn, until the 1986 launch of the MKII-based Belmont. For the first time since 1965, there was no coupé-bodied Kadett in the range: the previous Kadett C coupé was indirectly replaced by the three-door 1.3 SR sports model.

Technologically, the Kadett D was part of a major investment for Opel (and General Motors as a whole) in a new front-wheel drive architecture, with an all-new family of engines and transmissions which would later be applied in the larger Ascona C and the smaller Corsa A in 1981, and 1982, respectively. It was also the first application of the Family II engine design, with a single overhead camshaft, aluminium-alloy cylinder head, hydraulic valve lifters, with capacities of 1297 cc (producing 60 PS and 75 PS) and had a transaxle design that allowed the clutch to be replaced without removing the transmission unit. The Kadett D was also equipped with a 1600 cc diesel engine, an option which was first presented at the Brussels Motor Show in 1982.

This range of engines was also used for later models of the Corsa/Nova, and the mid-sized Cavalier/Ascona. From May 1981, the 1.3 was also available with a three-speed automatic. The automatic was made available to the diesel in September 1982. In the United Kingdom, Opels and Vauxhalls were initially sold through separate marketing operations, with overlapping lineups that competed directly with each other. By 1982 this anomaly had been sorted out and the Opel lineup was limited to the well-equipped five-door Berlina (1.3S or 1.6S) and the sporty 1.6 SR, leaving most of the market to the Vauxhall-badged cars.

One interesting version which first appeared in mid-1982 was the Kadett Pirsch, (for deer stalking, a stealthy form of hunting). In non-German-speaking countries it was generally marketed as the "Kadett Off Road." This was a station wagon with rustic trim, fitted with a limited-slip differential, reinforced suspension and more suitable tires, increased ground clearance, a skid plate, and shortened front fenders. In Sweden, a special postal Kadett ("Opel Kadett Post") was offered, fitted with a high roof (necessitating a unique and much taller windshield) and a sliding right-hand door, RHD, and the automatic transmission. This version was converted by Karosseriefabrik Voll  in Würzburg, Germany. Voll also made a postal version of the later Kadett E.

The Kadett D was also sold as the IDA Kadett and assembled Kikinda, Yugoslavia. In Indonesia, PT. Garmak Motor was also reproduced Kadett D after 1984 in Jakarta, only for local market general buyers and taxi fleets until around 1995. It was later replaced by Opel Optima (Astra F) sedan. Only available as a 5-door hatchback, with carburetted 1298 cc GM Family 1 engine and 5-speed manual transmission.

Models

South Africa
The Opel Kadett D was also built in South Africa by General Motors South African (Pty) Ltd. The South African range was made up of four-door fastback sedans, five-door hatchbacks, and a five-door estate model called the Voyage. The engines used are Opel's 1.2-litre overhead valve inline-four (L models only), or the OHC 1.3-litre (GL, GLS, and Voyage). Later a 1.6 L was added and also a 1.8 L in the GTE performance model.

Small engine sizes with round lights on the bonnet while large engine sizes would have square lights on the bonnet.

Kadett E (1984–1995)

The Kadett E (Vauxhall Astra Mark 2 in the United Kingdom) was introduced in August 1984, and was voted the 1985 European Car of the Year. The 1984 model was also developed into a more conventional three-box design with a boot (trunk), badged as the Vauxhall Belmont in the United Kingdom, launched at Frankfurt 1985. This was awarded the 1985 Semperit Irish Car of the Year in Ireland. There was a station wagon called the "Caravan", available with either three or five doors. In South Africa, the Kadett notchback was sold as the Opel Monza, along with a convertible. This replaced the Opel Ascona.

The car was noted for its advanced aerodynamics and distinctive "teardrop" shape - mirroring the trend in the mid 1980s for swooping aerodynamic styling - with the front end styling taken directly from the Opel Tech 1 concept car of 1981, although some styling cues from the Kadett D were retained for continuity such as its 'Kamm tail' and oversized C-pillar extraction vent.

A convertible version was also available, for the first time in 1987, built by Bertone of Torino, Italy, bringing it to line with competitors, such as the Ford Escort and Volkswagen Golf. For the 1988 model, capacities were raised from 1.3 to 1.4 litres. In the fall of 1986 a new 1,998 cc engine replaced the 1.8 hitherto used on the GSi and Vauxhall Astra GTE in many markets, although the 1.8 continued to be sold in some places. In 1988, a 16-valve twin-cam version was developed for a high-performance GSi/GTE model, yielding  in non-catalyzed form, six less horsepower with a catalytic converter fitted. While criticized for a lack of refinement, the GSi 16V was also lauded as the most powerful car available in its class at the time. Aside from the "16V" badging, it could be told from an eight-valve GSi by its twin rectangular exhaust pipes.

The Kadett E was a grey import in the United Kingdom, but not popular compared to its badge engineered sister, the Vauxhall Astra Mk II. It was never officially sold in Britain, and by 1989, General Motors was only marketing the Vauxhall brand in the United Kingdom, although Astras assembled at Vauxhall's Ellesmere Port plant were exported to the rest of Europe badged as Opel Kadetts. There was also a van version with a raised roof, called the Opel Kadett Combo in Europe, and the Bedford Astramax in the United Kingdom.

Other markets
In Brazil, the Kadett E succeeded some versions of the Chevrolet Chevette and was introduced as the Chevrolet Kadett, with the station wagon version called the Chevrolet Ipanema. The latter had three doors until model year 1993, when five doors became mandatory. The hatchback was only available with three doors, and the sedan was never offered. Brazilian production of the hatchback commenced in April 1989, with the Ipanema being added in October. From 1995 all versions featured fuel injection. Brazilian cars received either 1.8 or 2.0 L petrol or ethanol fours. The Ipanema was discontinued in 1996, and the Kadett, in 1998.

While the Ipanema clearly succeeded the Marajó, production of the Chevette (by now in sedan form only, the hatchback having been discontinued after the 1987 model year) and of the Kadett noticeably overlapped; the newer model was placed above the old one in Chevrolet's lineup. While Chevrolet entertained the possibility of a pick-up version of the Kadett E, it never materialized.

A convertible version of the Kadett was also offered in Brazil. It was made available between 1991 and 1994, its body was sent to the Bertone factory in Italy and finished in Brazil. It was only available with the 2.0-litre multi-point electronic injection engine with 121 ps / 120 hp.

In the early 1990s, South African Kadett GSi's were further upgraded based on their success in production car racing and initially 500 special units were built as road cars for homologation purposes. This was a minimum requirement for entry into the Stannic Group N races. They went against BMW's 325iS (A 2.7 L homologation special from BMW). They featured more aggressive 276-degree camshafts made by Schrick with 2 different settings for timing overlap (110° and 107°), revised intake and exhaust modifications (4-in-1 branch manifold and freeflow exhaust), Irmscher spring kit, modified engine management system by Promotec, a limited-slip differential developed by Andre Verwey and special Aluett 7Jx15-inch ET35 alloy wheels, they were nicknamed the "Superboss" and held the world record for the most torque per litre (114 Nm per litre) for a naturally aspirated car until being beaten by the Ferrari 458 (117 Nm per litre) in 2009. After the required 500 units were produced, many more were built to satisfy public demand.

The Kadett E formed the basis of the Daewoo LeMans (later known as the Daewoo Cielo, Racer and Nexia) in South Korea, Nexia being the hatchback version), which was sold in the United States and New Zealand as the Pontiac LeMans, and in Canada (initially) as the Passport Optima. LeMans sales ended in 1993. The Nexia was produced until 2016 at the UzDaewoo plant in Asaka, Uzbekistan. The Cielo was last being produced at Automobile Craiova, a semi-independent (from GM) plant in Craiova, Romania. Their license expired in the fall of 2006, and Cielo was produced until 2007.

Astra shape
In 1991, GM Europe decided to standardise model names across its two brands, and Opel adopted Vauxhall's name for the Kadett, Astra, for the replacement car for Europe which debuted that year. Only South Africa kept the Kadett name until the 1999 (Astra/Kadett F), whereafter all models took the Astra name.

However, under Opel's internal naming convention, successive generations of the Astra platform are treated as a logical continuation of the Kadett lineage, hence the original 1991 Astra was designated Astra F in relation to the previous Kadett E. This convention has continued through the current Astra L.

See also
GM Stir-Lec I,  1969 concept hybrid electric car based on Opel Kadett body

References

Literature
 
 
 

Kadett
Compact cars
Hatchbacks
Sedans
Station wagons
Cars introduced in 1937
1940s cars
1960s cars
1970s cars
1980s cars
1990s cars
Group 4 (racing) cars